Binette Schroeder (5 December 1939 – 5 July 2022) was a German author and illustrator.

Biography
Born in Hamburg, Schroeder studied typography in Munich and continued her studies in painting at the Schule für Gestaltung Basel. She wrote and illustrated numerous children's books, some of which received international awards, including two awards at the Biennial of Illustration Bratislava. She lived in Munich with her husband, illustrator Peter Nickl.

Binette Schroeder died in Gräfelfing on 5 July 2022 at the age of 82.

Works
 Flora's Magic House (1969), written and illustrated by Binette Schroeder, published by NordSüd
 Archibald and his Little Red Cheek (1970), written and illustrated by Binette Schroeder, published by Verlag Heinrich Ellermann
 Florian and Tractor Max (1971), written and illustrated by Binette Schroeder, published by NordSüd
 Lelebum: A Rhyming and Pictorial Elephant Tale (1972), written and illustrated by Binette Schroeder, published by Thienemann-Esslinger Verlag
 Ra ta ta tam, the Strange Story of a Little Engine (1973), written by Peter Nickl, illustrated by Binette Schroeder, published by NordSüd
 Crocodile Crocodile (1975), written by Peter Nickl, illustrated by Binette Schroeder, published by NordSüd
 The Wonderful Travels and Adventures of Baron Münchhausen, as Told by Himself in the Company of his Friends and Washed Down by Many a Good Bottle of Wine: The Adventures on Land (1977), based on the versions by Rudolf Erich Raspe and Gottfried August Bürger, written by Peter Nickl, illustrated by Binette Schroeder, published by NordSüd
 Zebby Gone with the Wind (1981), written and illustrated by Binette Schroeder, published by Walker Books
 Shop, Zebby, Shop (1981), written and illustrated by Binette Schroeder, published by Walker Books
 Zebby's Breakfast (1981), written and illustrated by Binette Schroeder, published by Walker Books
 Run, Zebby, Run, Run, Run (1981), written and illustrated by Binette Schroeder, published by Walker Books
 Zebby Goes Swimming (1981), written and illustrated by Binette Schroeder, published by Walker Books
 The Shadow Sewing Machine (1982), written by Michael Ende, illustrated by Binette Schroeder, published by Thienemann-Esslinger Verlag
 The Dreaming House: A Walk Through the Night (1982), written by Peter Nickl, illustrated by Binette Schroeder, published by Edition Weitbrecht
 Tuffa and the Snow (1983), written and illustrated by Binette Schroeder, published by Dial Books for Young Readers
 Tuffa and the Bone (1983), written and illustrated by Binette Schroeder, published by Dial Books for Young Readers
 Tuffa and her Friends (1983), written and illustrated by Binette Schroeder, published by Dial Books for Young Readers
 Tuffa and the Picnic (1983), written and illustrated by Binette Schroeder, published by Dial Books for Young Readers
 Tuffa and the Ducks (1983), written and illustrated by Binette Schroeder, published by Dial Books for Young Readers
 The Cow Book (1983), compiled by Marc Gallant, illustrated by Marc Gallant, Wayne Anderson, Keleck, James Marsh, Braldt Bralds, Yōko Ochida, Michel Guiré-Vaka, B. G. Sharma, Lidia Postma, Bushiri Mruta Awazi, Jean Christian Knaff, Luba Simansky, Binette Schroeder, Étienne Delessert, Martin Leman, Jocelyne Pache, Boris Vallejo, Claude Lapointe, Nicholas Price, Josef Paleček, Waldemar Świerzy, Ivan Generalić, Mark Hess, Alain Gauthier, Robert Giusti, and Robert Rodriguez, published by Alfred A. Knopf
 Beauty and the Beast (1986), written by Mme Leprince de Beaumont, retold by Anne Carter, illustrated by Binette Schroeder, published by Walker Books
 The Frog Prince or Iron Henry (1989), written by the Brothers Grimm (Wilhelm Grimm and Jacob Grimm), illustrated by Binette Schroeder, published by NordSüd
Die Vollmondlegende (1993)
Engel und anderes Geflügel. Ein Adventskalender zum Malen, Basteln und Schnippeln (1997)
Laura (1999)
Ritter Rüstig & Ritter Rostig (2009)
Der Zauberling (2014)
Bilderbuch-Brunnen (2019)
Herr Grau & Frieda Fröhlich (2021)

Distinctions
 (1971)
 (1973)
Prix Octogones (2000)
Deutscher Jugendliteraturpreis (2004)
Bavarian Order of Merit (2012)

References

1939 births
2022 deaths
Writers from Hamburg
German illustrators
German women children's writers
German women illustrators